The Centre for Forestry Research and Human Resource Development Chhindwara was established in 1995 as an advanced research centre under the umbrella of ICFRE, Dehradun.

Mandate
Forestry research with Human Resource Development in areas like biodiversity conservation, forest protection, silviculture, non-wood forest products, socio economics and tree improvement for poverty alleviation. The main stake holders for training programmes are farmer, students, Forest officers and scientist from forestry sector.

See also
 Indian Council of Forestry Research and Education
 Van Vigyan Kendra (VVK) Forest Science Centres

References

Indian forest research institutes
Indian Council of Forestry Research and Education
Ministry of Environment, Forest and Climate Change
Research institutes in Madhya Pradesh
1995 establishments in Madhya Pradesh
Research institutes established in 1995